The IMOCA 60 Class yacht Bagages Superior 101 was designed by Group Finot and launched in 1992 after being built by CDK Technologies based in Lorient, France. The boat was the only ketch rig to win the Vendee Globe for later races the mizzen was removed but the boat is now based in Poland.

Racing results

References 

1990s sailing yachts
Sailboat type designs by Groupe Finot
Vendée Globe boats
IMOCA 60